"No Guns Allowed" is a song by American rapper Snoop Lion featuring Canadian rapper Drake and singer Cori B. Was released on April 4, 2013 as the third single of his twelfth studio album Reincarnated, with the record labels Berhane Sound System, Vice Records, Mad Decent and RCA.

The track samples parts of a song by Beirut  called Nantes, especially the opening of the song.

Music video 
The official video was released on April 5, 2013.

Track listing 
Download digital
No Guns Allowed (featuring Cori B and Drake) — 3:46

Chart performance

Weekly charts

References

2013 singles
Snoop Dogg songs
Drake (musician) songs
Songs written by Snoop Dogg
Songs written by Drake (musician)
2013 songs
Songs written by Ariel Rechtshaid
Songs written by Diplo
Song recordings produced by Ariel Rechtshaid
RCA Records singles
Music videos directed by Jessy Terrero